Jameson Chikowero (born 11 December 1996) is a Zimbabwean cricketer. He made his first-class debut for Mid West Rhinos in the 2017–18 Logan Cup on 10 October 2017.

References

External links
 

1996 births
Living people
Zimbabwean cricketers
Place of birth missing (living people)
Mid West Rhinos cricketers